Aprominta designatella is a moth of the family Autostichidae. It is found in Albania, Bosnia and Herzegovina, Croatia, Serbia, Bulgaria, Romania, North Macedonia, Greece, Russia and Turkey.

References

Moths described in 1855
Aprominta
Moths of Europe
Moths of Asia